Philodendron domesticum, also called the spadeleaf philodendron, the elephant ear philodendron, or burgundy philodendron, is a plant in the genus Philodendron. Philodendron domesticum is also commonly grown as a houseplant in temperate climates.

References 

domesticum
House plants
Plants described in 1966